Melody Yeung may refer to:
Melody Yeung (bowler), ten-pin bowler from Hong Kong
Melody Yeung (singer), member of Machi (hip hop group)